Talentadong Pinoy (transl,"Talented Pinoy"  also known as '"Bangon Talentadong Pinoy"', (transl, "Get Up, Talented Pinoy" for its eighth season is a Philippine reality talent show broadcast by TV5. The show premiere on August 16, 2008. Hosted initially by Ryan Agoncillo in its first five seasons, within exception of seasons 6 and 7, the show is handled formerly by Robin Padilla and Mariel Rodriguez, it displays performances from singers, dancers, actors, musicians and comedians, to contortionists, impressionists, jugglers, ventriloquists and magicians. Contestants are allowed to perform any act they want. One difference to the Got Talent series is that the judges give their opinions on the performance of the performer and grades only 50% of the final score while the jury also grades 50% of the score to determine the winner. Its recent season aired every Saturday at 8 p.m. (PST). The show ended on March 13, 2021, and was replaced by 1000 Heartbeats: Pintig Pinoy.

Overview

The show aims to display and advance performances considered as talented by the judges. The audition process is mostly held in SM locations all over the Philippines. The judging panel is composed of "talent scouts" (three famous persons who decide if the performers are passed on their performances) and the "jury" (composed of about eight to ten ordinary persons with professions or occupations and are the main judges in the contest). (If several contestants are passed by the talent scouts, the jury will decide who will become the winner. The jury is changed randomly in every show.)

The contestants perform on stage within 1 minute and 30 seconds. When the performers successfully do their act in that time, the bell rings, indicating that the contestant succeeded. If the talent scouts don't like the act, they simply press their respective buzzers and the curtain will be closed partially. When the contestants receive three strikes from the talent scouts, the curtain will be completely closed accompanied by the buzzer, notifying that the performer's act is terminated. Mostly seven competitors will compete if there is a defending champion; there are eight contestants if it is searching for a new defending champion. They will become the defending champion when the performer wins on the contest either by unanimous or split-decision by the jury. They must defend their title for five consecutive weeks against other performers. If they succeed in defending the title, the defending champion becomes a "Hall of Famer."

Hosts

Current
Ryan Agoncillo (2008–2013; 2020–2021)

Talent Scouts
John Arcilla (2020–2021)
Janice de Belen (2020–2021)
Joross Gamboa (2020–2021)

Guest talent scouts
K Brosas (2020)
John Lapus (2020–2021)
Alessandra De Rossi (2020–2021)
Tuesday Vargas (2021)
Ruffa Gutierrez (2021)
Cathy Garcia-Molina (2021)

Previous
Robin Padilla (2014)
Mariel Rodriguez (2014)
Tuesday Vargas (2014; Audience and Backstage Host)

Seasons

Season 1
In the first season, a contestant is hailed a "Hall of Fame" winner when he/she/they defend their title for five consecutive weeks.

Battle of the Champions was held at 7:30 pm, on March 6, 2010 at the Cuneta Astrodome. It was a competition for the seven Hall of Famers to become "Philippine's Ultimate Talentado" and Grand Prize of 1,000,000 pesos. Joining them is a "Wildcard Competitor", who is a failed Talentado with a chance to compete with the Hall of Famers. Jackielyn from Cavite was revealed on March 2010 as the Wildcard Competitor.

The criteria for judging consists of 50% text votes and 50% jury's decision (which was composed of 6-8 judges). Some notable contestants of Talentadong Pinoy appear on the intermission numbers of the Battle of the Champions. Yoyo Tricker was declared the First Ultimate Talentado and won for 1,000,000 pesos in cash. Jessa Joy Mendoza

Season 2
Following the first Battle of the Champions there were some changes on Talentadong Pinoy:

The stage is now on 180-degree view.
For a contestant to be part of the "Hall of Fame", they must defend their title for eight consecutive episodes.
The color of the curtain is changed from black to red.
There are now four talent scouts. They can now handle the decision of the contestants' performance.
The criteria for judging is obtained by 1/3 from talent scouts and 2/3 from the jury.
The after the talent scouts' evaluation the contestant's rating from the talent scout will be shown in four red bar graphs but the ratings' form the jury is in the one green bar which is not shown instead it display as a question mark.
The program is aired on Saturdays and Sundays.

On March 12 and 13, 2011, the Battle of the Champions was held at Ynares Center, Antipolo City. A Celebrity Edition was announced to be held on the Grand Finals. Each celebrity will be accompanied by Season 1 Hall of Famers. Ciara Sotto (with Far East Acrobats) Winner, Valeen Montenegro (with The Tribal Dancers), Regine Tolentino (with Makata Tawanan), and Rosanna Roces (with Leah Patricio) will compete respectively. Joseph the Artist declared the Second Ultimate Talentado, taking home 1,000,000 pesos, a new car, four-year college scholarship, and a chance to represent the Philippines at the World Championships of the Performing Arts (WCOPA) to be held in Hollywood, USA. In addition to the major prizes, three contestants (including Joseph the Artist) won PHP 10,000 for being the Champion Detergent Bar's Kahanga-Hangang Performance Awardees.

Season 3
Astroboy became the Third Ultimate Talentado in the Battle of the Champions held at the Quezon City Memorial Circle on May 6, 2012. He won P1 million cash with a brand new car. He was also given the opportunity to represent the country in the world Championship of the Performing arts (WCOPA) in Hollywood.

Season 4
Talentadong Pinoy was revived in 2014 with Robin Padilla and Mariel Rodriguez as the new hosts. Meanwhile, Tuesday Vargas was added as the backstage

Season 5
Talentadong Pinoy was revived by TV5 and Cignal TV in 2020 under its new title, Bangon Talentadong Pinoy. Agoncillo will return as a host for its revival season with talent scouts Joross Gamboa, Janice de Belen and John Arcilla, known as the "Triple J". The season is focusing on the talents who affected of the COVID-19 pandemic. The talents can be auditioned on its official Facebook page of Bangon Talentadong Pinoy.

Spin-offs
After Season 3 Battle of the Champions, Talentadong Pinoy launched new spin-offs aside from the current competition: Talentadong Pinoy Kids, Talentadong Pinoy International Edition, Talentadong Pinoy Worldwide and Talentadong Pinoy Junior.

Hall of Famers/Battle of the Champions contestants/current champions

Season 1

Season 2

 Joseph the Artist originally lost to Cedie (singer/one-time defending champion). However, after the 8-win rule was implemented, Joseph was placed in the Hall of Fame having won nine times.

Season 3

 Dancing is Fun won the "Make It or Break It" edition, a wildcard show competed by former champions who did not made the Hall of Fame.
 Melbelline performed "waray-waray" with a modern twist, but later perform a kundiman as a request of a talent-scout

Talentadong Pinoy Kids Season 1

Talentadong Pinoy International Edition

Talentadong Pinoy Worldwide 2013

To enter the hall of fame must have 6 wins and defend the title.

Season 4
Color keys
 - Ultimate Talentado season four
 - Hall of famer (Advanced to Finals)
 - Hall of famer from Robin's pick (Advanced to finals)

Semifinal 1

Semifinal 2

Wildcard

Finals

Awards

KBP Golden Dove
Winner, Best Talent Show (2009 & 2010)

MTRCB Awards
Winner, Best Talent Show (2009)

PMPC Star Awards for TV
Winner, Best Talent Search Program (2011)^
Winner, Best Talent Search Program (2009)
Winner, Best Talent Search Program Host (2009)
Nominated, Best Talent Search Program & Host (2008, 2010 & 2011)
Winner, Best Talent Search Program (2012)
Winner, Best Talent Search Program (2013)

^ = tied with Showtime (ABS-CBN 2)

Catholic Mass Media Awards
Winner, Best Entertainment Program (2012) 
Nominated, Best Talent Show (2008, 2009 & 2010)

USTv Students Choice Awards
Nominated, Best Talent Show (2008 & 2009)

Gawad UP Gandingan TV Awards
Nominated, Best Talent Show (2008 & 2009)

Guillermo Mendoza Box Office Entertainment Awards
Winner, 2011 Best TV Program-Talent Search and Most Popular TV Director (Rich Ilustre)
Winner, 2012 Most Popular TV Program Talent Search/Reality

ENPRESS
Winner, Best Original TV-Program-Talent Search (2013)

See also 
Kapatid Channel
List of programs aired by TV5 (Philippine TV network)
Pilipinas Got Talent

References

External links 

TV5 (Philippine TV network) original programming
Philippine reality television series
2008 Philippine television series debuts
2021 Philippine television series endings
2010s Philippine television series
2020s Philippine television series
Philippine game shows
Filipino-language television shows